Moffatdale is a rural locality in the South Burnett Region, Queensland, Australia. In the  Moffatdale had a population of 179 people.

Geography 
The Bjelke-Petersen Dam is in the west of the locality with the reservoir Lake Barambah extending through the south-west of the locality.

Although Moffatdale is not officially a town, there is a residential subdivision near the school. Apart from this, the land use is a mixture of grazing on native vegetation and crop growing.

There are a number of homesteads in the locality, including:

 Barambah-Dale
 Bridgeman Downs
 Brigalow Park
 Dal Dowie Retreat
 Lakeview
 Moffatdale
 Parrishs Paddock
 Peppercorn
 Sunny Brae

History
Caulfield Provisional School opened on 1 November 1915. In 1916 it was renamed Barambah West Provisional School and again in 1918 as Moffatdale Provisional School. On 1 June 1926 it became Moffatdale State School.

In the  Moffatdale had a population of 179 people.

Education 
Moffatdale State School is a government primary (Prep-6) school for boys and girls at 892 Barambah Road. In 2018, the school had an enrolment of 42 students with 5 teachers (4 full-time equivalent) and 6 non-teaching staff (4 full-time equivalent).

There is no secondary school in Moffatdale. The nearest secondary school is Murgon State High School in neighbouring Murgon to the north-west.

Amenities 
There are two boat ramps into Lake Barambah known as:

 Bjelke-Petersen Dam (West)

 Bjelke-Petersen Dam (East)

Both are on Haager Drive and are managed by the South Burnett Regional Council.

References 

South Burnett Region
Localities in Queensland